Chhotubhai Amarasinhbhai Vasava (born 15 July 1945) is Indian politician from Western Indian state of Gujarat. He founded the Bharatiya Tribal Party (BTP) in 2017 after leaving Janata Dal (United). He is a seven term Member of the Legislative Assembly from the Jhagadia constituency since 1990.

Early life
He was born in Bharuch district, Gujarat. He belongs to an Adivasi ethnic Bhil tribal community.

Career 
He is an MLA from Jhagadiya Assembly constituency. He was a member of Janata Dal (United) (JD(U)) from 1990 to 2017. He left JD (U) when it formed an alliance with Bharatiya Janata Party in Bihar state in 2017.

He founded the Bharatiya Tribal Party (BTP), less than a month before the 2017 Gujarat Legislative Assembly election which won two seats in assembly in an alliance with the Indian National Congress.

He is a well-known tribal leader. He is one advocate of Bhilistan a separate state comprising tribal dominated parts of Gujarat, Rajasthan, Madhya Pradesh and Maharashtra.

Electoral performance

References

Living people
Janata Dal politicians
Janata Dal (United) politicians
1945 births
Bharatiya Tribal Party politicians
Adivasi politicians
Bhil people
Gujarat MLAs 1990–1995
Gujarat MLAs 1995–1998
Gujarat MLAs 1998–2002
Gujarat MLAs 2002–2007
Gujarat MLAs 2007–2012
Gujarat MLAs 2012–2017
Gujarat MLAs 2017–2022